The White Room is the fourth and final studio album by British electronic music group The KLF, released on 3 March 1991. The album features versions of the band's hit singles, including "What Time Is Love?", "3 a.m. Eternal", and "Last Train to Trancentral".

Originally scheduled for 1989 as the soundtrack to a film of the same name, the album's direction was changed after both the film and the original soundtrack LP were cancelled. Most tracks on the original album version are present in the final 1991 release, though in significantly remixed form. The White Room was supposed to be followed by a darker, harder complementary album The Black Room, but that plan was abandoned when the KLF retired in 1992.

On 23 April 2021, a re-edited version of the album was officially released on streaming platforms, in a series of digital reissues, as The White Room (Director's Cut), featuring new edits of original tracks from 1989–1990 sessions.

Background
The White Room was conceived as the soundtrack to a road movie, also called The White Room, about the KLF's search for the mystical White Room that would enable them to be released from their contract with Eternity. Parts of the movie were filmed in the Sierra Nevada region of Spain, using the money that the duo, under the alias The Timelords, had made with their 1988 number-one hit "Doctorin' the Tardis". The soundtrack album contained pop-house versions of some of the KLF's earlier "Pure Trance" singles, as well as new songs.

The film project was fraught with difficulties and setbacks, including dwindling funds. Drummond and Cauty had released "Kylie Said to Jason", a single from the original soundtrack, in the hopes that it could "rescue them from the jaws of bankruptcy"; it flopped commercially, however, failing to make even the UK top 100. As a consequence, The White Room film project was put on hold, and the KLF abandoned the musical direction of the soundtrack and single. Neither the film nor the soundtrack album were formally released, although bootleg copies of both exist.

Meanwhile, the KLF's single "What Time Is Love?", which had originally been released in 1988 and largely ignored by the public, was generating acclaim within the underground clubs of continental Europe; according to KLF Communications, "The KLF were being feted by all the 'right' DJs". This prompted Drummond and Cauty to pursue the acid house tone of their Pure Trance series. A further Pure Trance release, "Last Train to Trancentral", followed.

In October 1990, the KLF launched a series of singles with an upbeat pop-house sound they dubbed "Stadium House". Songs from The White Room soundtrack were re-recorded with rap and more vocals (by guests labelled "Additional Communicators"), a sample-heavy pop-rock production, and crowd noise samples. The "Stadium House" versions of "What Time Is Love?" and "3 a.m. Eternal" were immediate hits, with "3 a.m. Eternal" becoming the KLF's second, and the only one under the name, number-one release. These "Stadium House" tracks made up a large part of The White Room when it was eventually released in March 1991, substantially reworked from the original version. Aside from the singles, "Make It Rain", "Build a Fire", "Church of the KLF" and "The White Room" appeared in significantly more minimal, ambient and dub-oriented versions on the final album. "Go to Sleep" was reworked to become "Last Train to Trancentral".

From the original recorded that was planned for release in 1989 as Tunes from the White Room, in 1997, a bootleg CD, taken from a low-quality cassette rip was released and included some bonus tracks. A higher-quality version, allegedly created by someone who mastered the original album DAT in a professional studio was hosted on a popular KLF fan site, KLF.de in the early 2000s.

Director's Cut 
On 23 April 2021, The White Room (Director's Cut) was officially released as the fourth part of the series of remastered digital compilations under the collective title Samplecity thru Trancentral. The album's edition includes tracks from the unreleased 1989 album, plus versions of  "Madrugada Eterna" and "Last Train to Trancentral".

Critical reception

Iestyn George of Q called The White Room "strikingly imaginative" and "a more subtle form of subterfuge" than previous works. In a retrospective review of the album, John Bush of AllMusic said that The White Room "represents the commercial and artistic peak of late-'80s acid-house"  A retrospective review by Splendid magazine thought some of the tracks to be filler and the album "silly" in places, but were extremely impressed by the "Stadium House" songs. "As providers of perverse, throwaway, three-minute pop-song manna," they concluded, "the KLF were punk rock, the Renaissance, Andy Warhol and Jesus Christ all rolled into one."

In 1993, NME staff and contributors voted the album the 81st best of all time, and in 2000, Q magazine listed it as the 89th best British album of all time. Scotland on Sunday listed The White Room in their "Essential 100", and readers of Scotland's Is this music? magazine voted the album the 44th best "Scottish" LP of all time. The White Room is included in the book 1001 Albums You Must Hear Before You Die.

Track listing

1989 Tunes from The White Room (unreleased)

1991 album release

1991 North American release

2021 Director's Cut

Personnel
Jimmy Cauty – production, performance and programming
Bill Drummond – production, performance, vocals and programming

Additional performers
Nick Coler – keyboards, additional programming, backing vocals ("3 a.m. Eternal")
Maxine Harvey – vocals, backing vocals (except "What Time Is Love?", "Justified and Ancient")
Black Steel – vocals, scat singing, bass guitar ("No More Tears", "Justified and Ancient"), piano ("No More Tears")
Ricardo Lyte – rap ("3 a.m. Eternal" and "Last Train to Trancentral")
Isaac Bello – rap ("What Time Is Love?")
Tony Thorpe – breaks, samples
Duy Khiem – tenor saxophone ("Make It Rain"), clarinet ("The White Room")
Graham Lee – pedal steel ("Build a Fire")
P. P. Arnold – vocals
Katie Kissoon – vocals
Wanda Dee – sampled vocals

Charts

Weekly charts

Year-end charts

Certifications

References

1991 albums
The KLF albums
KLF Communications albums
Albums produced by the KLF
House music albums by British artists